Williams Peak is a summit in the U.S. state of Idaho, with an elevation of .

Williams Peak has the name of Hubert C. Williams, a forestry official.

References

Mountains of Idaho
Mountains of Valley County, Idaho